Huỳnh Văn Hải (born 20 August 1940) is a Vietnamese former swimmer. He competed in the men's 200 metre breaststroke at the 1964 Summer Olympics.

References

1940 births
Living people
Vietnamese male swimmers
Olympic swimmers of Vietnam
Swimmers at the 1964 Summer Olympics
Place of birth missing (living people)